Spirit tv is a non-profit Christian music station which airs in a stream on the Internet, on the Sky Angel satellite network and also on Roku devices. It is owned by Spirit Communications, which also owns RadioU.  Spirit tv plays adult contemporary music and has little to no programming, other than the VJ's.  Spirit tv was formerly known as Spirit Television until early 2017.

External links
 Official website

Music video networks in the United States